This is a list of broadcasters for the Columbus Blue Jackets ice hockey team.

Television
On Fox Sports Ohio, Jeff Rimer serves as the television play-by-play announcer alongside former Blue Jacket Jody Shelley providing color analysis. Rimer started calling games on television in 2005 with Shelley joining Rimer in 2014–15 replacing previous analyst Bill Davidge. Davidge became co-host of Blue Jackets Live, the televised pre-game, intermission and post-game shows, with Brian Giesenschlag until his retirement at the conclusion of the 2018–2019 season. Beginning with the 2019–2020 season, Giesenschlag's co-host is former Blue Jacket Jean-Luc Grand-Pierre. In-game reporting is provided by Dave Maetzold.

Radio
On radio stations WBNS-FM (flagship), WBNS, WWCD, and 34 other affiliates in Ohio and West Virginia, Bob McElligott provides play-by-play coverage. McElligott joined the Blue Jackets radio broadcast in July 2009 as a color commentator and became the play-by-play announcer for the 2013–14 season, taking over for George Matthews who had been calling Blue Jackets games since the team's inception in 2000. McElligott, along with Ryan Mitchell, hosts the pre-game and post-game radio shows. Fans can interact by e-mail and Twitter with McElligott and Mitchell during and after the game.

Notes
George Matthews held the position of the Blue Jackets' original radio play-by-play announcer from the team's inaugural season through the 2012–13 season.

See also
Historical NHL over-the-air television broadcasters
Cleveland_Barons_(NHL)#Broadcasters – The very first National Hockey League franchise to be based out of the state of Ohio from 1976 to 1978.

References

External links
Columbus Blue Jackets – Broadcast Bios ... – NHL.com
Columbus Blue Jackets TV Broadcast | Columbus ... – NHL.com
Columbus Blue Jackets Broadcaster Bill Davidge Announces Retirement
History of FSO Jackets announcers.
Columbus Blue Jackets Broadcast Info | Columbus ... – NHL.com
Former Blue Jackets star Jean-Luc Grand-Pierre joining Fox Sports Ohio as analyst

 
broadcasters
Lists of National Hockey League broadcasters
Fox Sports Networks
Bally Sports